Unstoppable is a compilation/studio album by Amii Stewart released in 1999 which includes new versions of some of the greatest hits from her disco career, selected tracks from the 80's and 90's as well as two previously unreleased recordings, the title track and "Can I Come Home".

Track listing
"Knock on Wood" (70s Revisited) - 3:44 
"Can I Come Home" - 3:45 
"Unstoppable" - 3:24 
"Friends" (New Version) - 4:49 
"Light My Fire" (New Version) - 3:55 
"Jealousy" (New Version) - 3:36 
"The Letter" (New Version) - 4:06 
"Why" - 4:32 
"Private Dancer" - 4:36 
"Knock on Wood" (99 East Coast Radio Edit) - 3:38 
"Lady Marmalade" - 3:32 
"Every Breath You Take" - 3:36 
"How Could I Know" (duet with Salva Campanile) - 4:15 
"Song for Daddy" - 4:21 
"Warm Embrace" - 3:56 
"Knock on Wood" ('99 Heavy Groove Club Mix) -5:49

Personnel
Amii Stewart - vocals

1999 albums
Amii Stewart albums